Collomena is a genus of moths of the family Nolidae described by Heinrich Benno Möschler in 1890. The Global Lepidoptera Names Index lists it as a synonym of Motya, but other databases such as Lepidoptera and Some Other Life Forms and Butterflies and Moths of the World list it as valid.

Species
Collomena chirica (Schaus, 1906) Mexico
Collomena filifera (Walker, 1857) Antilles to Brazil
Collomena fugax (Dyar, 1914) Panama
Collomena haematopis (Hampson, 1912) Argentina (Tucuman)
Collomena illegitima (Dyar, 1914) Panama
Collomena inflexa (Morrison, 1875) Florida
Collomena interstitia (Dyar, 1914) Panama, Costa Rica
Collomena leucopis (Schaus, 1910) Costa Rica
Collomena metaphaea (Hampson, 1912) Panama
Collomena murora (Dyar, 1914) Panama
Collomena olivaris (Dyar, 1912) Mexico
Collomena siopera (Dyar, 1914) Panama, Mexico

References

Chloephorinae